Farside Cannon is a science fiction novel by American writer Roger McBride Allen.

Plot summary
Relations between Settlement Worlds and Earth is a constant source of tension. A geologist, Garrison Morrow, discovers himself in the middle of the two parties when a series of peculiar events occur, thus leading him deeper and deeper into the delicate balance of political powers on the Moon and the rest of the Solar System.

External links

1988 American novels
1988 science fiction novels
Novels set on the Moon